Dodkhudoeva is a feminine surname. Notable people with the surname include:

Larisa Dodkhudoeva (born 1947), Tajikistani historian
Lola Dodkhudoeva (born 1951), Tajikistani historian

Slavic-language female forms of surnames